Adrian Anthony Spears (July 8, 1910 – May 9, 1991) was a United States district judge of the United States District Court for the Western District of Texas.

Education and career

Born in Darlington, South Carolina, Spears received a Bachelor of Laws from the University of South Carolina School of Law in 1934, and was in private practice in Darlington from 1934 to 1936, and then in San Antonio, Texas from 1937 to 1961. He was a special district judge of the State of Texas in 1951.

Federal judicial service

On October 5, 1961, Spears received a recess appointment from President John F. Kennedy to a new seat on the United States District Court for the Western District of Texas created by 75 Stat. 80. He was formally nominated to the same seat by President Kennedy on January 15, 1962. He was confirmed by the United States Senate on March 16, 1962, and received his commission the following day. He served as Chief Judge from 1962 to 1979, assuming senior status on October 10, 1979. He was a Judge of the Temporary Emergency Court of Appeals from 1981 to 1982. He retired from the federal judiciary entirely on December 31, 1982.

Post judicial service

Spears was thereafter a vice president of Tetco, Inc., in San Antonio, from 1983 until his death in that city on May 9, 1991.

References

Sources
 

1910 births
1991 deaths
Judges of the United States District Court for the Western District of Texas
United States district court judges appointed by John F. Kennedy
20th-century American judges
20th-century American lawyers